In computing, a SubOS may mean several related concepts:
A process-specific protection mechanism allowing potentially dangerous applications to run in a restricted environment. It worked by setting a sub-user id which was user id of the owner of the file rather than the person running the file.
A substitute-operating system, which simulated a full operating system. These were mainly developed by the GameMaker community.
An interface (graphical or terminal based) that provides additional functions or command for a specific audience target.
It can also make processes easier and add details to the main operating system.

See also
Virtual machine
Sandbox (computer security)

Computing terminology
Operating system security
Virtualization software